Felix Konrad Fernström (August 31, 1916 – March 11, 1991) was a Swedish bobsledder who competed in the early 1950s. At the 1952 Winter Olympics in Oslo, he finished sixth in the four-man event.

References
1952 bobsleigh four-man results
Bobsleigh four-man result: 1948-64

1916 births
1991 deaths
Swedish male bobsledders
Olympic bobsledders of Sweden
Bobsledders at the 1952 Winter Olympics
20th-century Swedish people